Paul Lim Leong Hwa (born 25 January 1954) is a Singaporean professional darts player. He was the first player to hit a perfect nine-dart finish during the Embassy World Darts Championship, which he achieved in 1990 during his second round match against Jack McKenna. Lim won £52,000 for his nine-darter, which was £28,000 more than Phil Taylor won for winning the tournament. Lim's was the only nine-dart finish in a world championship match until 2009, when Raymond van Barneveld completed one against Jelle Klaasen. It was also the only nine-dart finish ever achieved at the BDO World Darts Championship.

Lim represented four countries in darts; Singapore was not affiliated with the sport's governing body, the World Darts Federation (WDF), so Lim played briefly for Papua New Guinea, but settled in California and represented the United States in international competition, before also playing for his native country when they became a WDF playing nation. Lim has also represented Singapore at the PDC World Cup of Darts, and in the 2017 PDC World Cup of Darts, he and his teammate Harith Lim, reached the quarter-finals, defeating the top seeds Scotland (Gary Anderson and Peter Wright) in the first round. However, in the 2019 WDF World Cup he represented Hong Kong.

Career

Early career
He made his World Championship debut in 1982, losing a first-round match to Dave Whitcombe. He failed to progress beyond the second round for the next seven years – losing to the likes of Cliff Lazarenko (twice), Bob Anderson, Mike Gregory, and John Lowe (three times). Then in 1990 he hit the headlines and jackpot as he achieved the first World Championship nine-dart finish against Jack McKenna in the second round on 9 January. The bonus prize of £52,000 was more than eventual tournament winner Phil Taylor claimed for becoming world champion. It was the only year that Lim reached the quarter-finals of the event, losing again to Lazarenko.

He continued to come up against the biggest names in the game in the world championship: Alan Warriner, John Part (en route to the 1994 title), and Lowe defeated him again in the years after his nine-darter.

Lim decided to switch to darts' other organisation, the World Darts Council (now PDC) later in 1994 and made his debut at the 1994 World Matchplay. Lim never enjoyed any success in the PDC – he won only one match in the PDC World Championship, despite appearing in the tournament each year between 1997 and 2002. Although he no longer competes on the darts circuit full-time, Lim still competes at tournaments in his home country. He reached the last 16 of the Las Vegas Open in January 2007.

He won many titles in and around his native country including five Singapore Opens, five Malaysian Opens, and five Asian Cups, but his failure to reach the final stages of the British Darts Organisation and Professional Darts Corporation major tournaments has meant he will be best remembered for his 1990 nine-dart achievement.

Later career
Lim made his first appearance in the World Championships for 11 years after being awarded a place in the 2013 PDC World Darts Championship, as a result of being the World Soft Tip Champion. He beat Mohd Latif Sapup in the preliminary round 4–1 to set up a first-round match against second favourite for the tournament Michael van Gerwen. Lim lost 3–0, despite hitting the tournament's first 170 finish as well as twelve scores of 140 or more during the match.
Lim qualified for the 2014 World Championship via the International Qualifiers. He was drawn against Japan's Morihiro Hashimoto in the preliminary round and was beaten 4–2. Lim made his debut in the 2014 World Cup of Darts as he represented Singapore with Harith Lim (no relation). They won five legs in a row in the opening round against Ireland to progress with a 5–3 win. In the second round Paul lost to South Africa's Devon Petersen, but Harith beat Graham Filby to mean a doubles match was required to settle the tie. Singapore were edged out 4–3, but never had a dart for the match. Lim lost in the final of the 2015 French Dartslive event to Leonard Gates, but won the Soft Tip Qualifier for the 2016 World Championship for the second time by seeing off Boris Krčmar 4–2 in the final. He went on to play Aleksandr Oreshkin in the preliminary round and missed two match darts in a 2–1 set defeat. Lim and Harith made it to the second round of the 2016 World Cup, but lost their singles matches 4–2 to Austria's Mensur Suljović and Rowby-John Rodriguez. Lim won the Soft Tip Dartslive events in Taipei and Korea during the year.

In the first round of the 2017 World Cup Lim and Harith met the number one seeds of Scotland represented by Gary Anderson and Peter Wright. A 100 finish from Lim completed a huge 5–2 shock victory for Singapore and they then whitewashed Spain 4–0 in a doubles match to make it through to the quarter-finals of the event for the first time. Lim lost 4–1 to Belgium's Kim Huybrechts (who averaged 121.97), but Harith defeated Ronny Huybrechts 4–2. Singapore's tournament was ended in the deciding doubles match as Belgium progressed 4–2.

In the 2018 PDC World Darts Championship, he defeated Kai Fan Leung, and number 30 seed Mark Webster to set up a second round clash with Gary Anderson. He lost the match 4-1 and also missed double 12 for a nine dart finish. In the 2018 PDC World Cup of Darts, he again paired up with Harith, where they defeated New Zealand 5-3 to set up a second round clash with England. In the first round, Paul defeated world champion Rob Cross 4-2 with an average of 102.29. However, Harith lost his singles match to Dave Chisnall, meaning a doubles match was required which they lost 4-1.

Lim qualified for the 2019 PDC World Darts Championship by finishing 5th on the PDC Asian Tour. He lost to Ross Smith in round 1, After a successful 2019 Asian Tour, finishing 3rd this enabled him to qualify for the 2020 PDC World Darts Championship 

Lim took part in the 2019 WDF World Cup representing Hong Kong instead of Singapore.

World Championship results

BDO/WDF

PDC

WSDT
 2022: First round (lost to Dave Prins 1-3)

Career statistics

Performance timeline

WDF major finals: 4 (3 titles, 1 runner-up)

Nine-dart finishes

Paul Lim was the first player to manage a nine-dart finish in a world championship. He was the only player to achieve it at the BDO world championship. Lim won £52,000 which was more than tournament winner Phil Taylor who received £24,000.

References

External links
Paul Lim profile
Paul Lim DARTSLIVE PRO profile

1954 births
Singaporean darts players
Singaporean sportspeople of Chinese descent
Living people
British Darts Organisation players
Professional Darts Corporation associate players
Darts players who have thrown televised nine-dart games
PDC World Cup of Darts Singaporean team